Metasia suppandalis is a species of moth in the family Crambidae. It is found in France, Spain, Portugal, Croatia, Bulgaria, Romania, the Republic of Macedonia, Albania, Greece and Russia.

References

Moths described in 1823
Metasia
Moths of Europe